The 12477/12478 Jamnagar–Shri Mata Vaishno Devi Katra Superfast Express is a Superfast train of the Indian Railways connecting Jamnagar Junction in Gujarat and Shri Mata Vaishno Devi Katra of Jammu and Kashmir. It is currently being operated with 12477/12478 train numbers on a weekly basis.

Coach composition 

The train has Modern LHB rakes with max speed of 130 kmph. The train consists of 22 coaches :
 1 AC First 
 2 AC II Tier
 6 AC III Tier
 6 Sleeper Coaches
 1 Pantry Car
 2 General
 2 End On Generation

Service

The 12477/Jamnagar–Shri Mata Vaishno Devi Katra Superfast Express has an average speed of 62 km/hr and covers 2068 km in 33 hrs 25 mins.

The 12478/Shri Mata Vaishno Devi Katra–Jamnagar Superfast Express has an average speed of 63 km/hr and covers 2068 km in 32 hrs 50 mins.

Route and halts 

The important halts of the train are:

Schedule

Traction 

Both trains are hauled by a Vatva Loco Shed based WDM 3A or Sabarmati based WDP-4D diesel locomotive from Jamnagar to Ahmedabad and from Ahmedabad it is hauled by WAP-7 of Vadodara or Ghaziabad based electric locomotive  up till Shri Mata Vaishno Devi Katra and vice versa.

Rake sharing 

This train shares its rake with

 12471/12472 Swaraj Express
 12475/12476 Hapa–Shri Mata Vaishno Devi Katra Superfast Express
 12473/12474 Gandhidham - Shri Mata Vaishno Devi Katra Sarvodaya Express

Notes

See also 

 Jamnagar railway station
 Shri Mata Vaishno Devi Katra railway station

References

External links 

 12477/Jamnagar - Shri Mata Vaishno Devi Katra (Sindhu) SF Express
 12478/Shri Mata Vaishno Devi Katra - Jamnagar (Sindhu) SF Express

Transport in Jamnagar
Transport in Katra, Jammu and Kashmir
Express trains in India
Rail transport in Uttar Pradesh
Rail transport in Madhya Pradesh
Rail transport in Gujarat
Rail transport in Rajasthan
Rail transport in Delhi
Rail transport in Haryana
Rail transport in Punjab, India
Rail transport in Jammu and Kashmir
Railway services introduced in 1990